The Carpentier family is a noble family of French origins. One of its branches moved to the kingdoms of England and Scotland in the 15th century. Another branch, the Carpentier de Changy family, has been part of the Belgian nobility since 1892.

Branches 
 Carpentier de Changy
 Carpentier de Marigny

Origins 
This family descends from Colinet Carpentier, notary, attorney and manufacturer in Decize. He married Jehanneton de Savigny there on 28 February 1442

Notable members 

 Jehan Carpentier, merchant, master of forges, and councillor of Nevers from 1564.
 Jacques Carpentier de Marigny [fr] (1615-1673), satirical poet and prose writer, prior of Cessy, chamberlain of Christine of Sweden, in the court of the prince of Condé then of the cardinal of Retz, advisor and butler of the King.
 Francois Carpentier (1623-1676), King's Musketeer, volunteer in the company of the gendarmes of the duke of Orleans.
 Sir Arthur Marigni Carpentier, 1st Baronnet Carpentier, of France.
 François Carpentier de Changy (1714-1797), King's Musketeer, participated in the battles of Fontenoy, Rocoux, and Lauffeld and in the siege of Bergen op Zoom where he was injured.
 François Ignace Carpentier, Count de Changy [fr] (1753-1812), French royalist officer.
 Count Eugène Carpentier de Changy (1879-1936), Head of Protocol at the Belgian Ministry of Foreign Affairs.
 Alain Carpentier de Changy (1922-1994), Belgian racing driver.

Baronetcy 
The Carpentier Baronetcy, of France, was a title in the Baronetage of England. It was created under the reign of Richard Cromwell on 9 October 1658 for Arthur Marigni Carpentier, a gentleman of French origin. Nothing further is known of him or the title. The Baronetcy is now extinct.

Carpentier baronets, of France (1658)

Sir Arthur Marigni Carpentier, 1st Baronet

Heraldry

Allied families

See also 
 List of baronetcies in the Baronetage of England

Notes and references

Further reading 

 État présent de la noblesse belge, 1986, pp. 52–59. et 2019, pp. 87–97.
 Paul Janssens et Luc Duerloo, Armorial de la noblesse belge. Tome A-E. Bruxelles, 1992.
 Jean-François Houtart, Anciennes familles de Belgique. Bruxelles, 2008, p. 89. (anno 1442)
 Hervé Douxchamps, Les quarante familles belges les plus anciennes subsistantes : Carpentier de Changy, dans Le Parchemin, 1998, p. 210 et 2000, p. 456.
 Claude Drigon, Quatrième registre du Livre d'Or de la Noblesse, Paris, 1847, p. 117.

External links 

 

Extinct baronetcies in the Baronetage of England